The 9th European Athletics Championships were held from 16–21 September 1969 in the Karaiskaki Stadium of Athens, the capital of Greece. New at these championships were the women's 1500 metres and the women's 4×400 metres relay event.  Moreover, women's 80 metres hurdles was replaced by women's 100 metres hurdles.
Contemporaneous reports on the event were given in the Glasgow Herald.

Former East German runner Jürgen May, who had defected, was not allowed to compete for his new country, West Germany, due to IAAF rules requiring him to live there for at least three years; he had competed for East Germany in the 1966 championships. West German officials promptly withdrew their athletes from all individual events in protest, but decided to compete in the relay races as a symbolic gesture to show their respect for the Greek organisers. 

The Dutch decathlete Edward de Noorlander was disqualified for the use of amphetamine, the first disqualification for doping in athletics.

Medal summary
Complete results were published.

Men

 Max Klauß from East Germany jumped 8.00 in the final, which was a new championship record.
 Probably wind assisted. As of statistic handbooks Viktor Saneyev's mark wasn't ratified as a new championship record.

Women

Medal table

Participation
According to an unofficial count, 675 athletes from 30 countries participated in the event, one athlete more than the official number of 674 as published.

 (9)
 (18)
 (19)
 (27)
 (8)
 (60)
 (24)
 (57)
 (1)
 (24)
 (32)
 (3)
 (4)
 (36)
 (1)
 (4)
 (1)
 (9)
 (18)
 (51)
 (4)
 (17)
 (79)
 (6)
 (29)
 (19)
 (10)
 (71)
 (16)
 (18)

References

Results

External links
 European Athletics official website
 Athletix

 
European Athletics Championships
European Athletics Championships
International athletics competitions hosted by Greece
1969 in Greek sport
Sports competitions in Athens
1969 in European sport
September 1969 sports events in Europe
1960s in Athens
Athletics in Athens